In Greek mythology, Glaucus (means "greyish blue" or "bluish green" and "glimmering") was the name of the following figures:
 Glaucus, a sea-god
 Glaucus, son of Sisyphus and a Corinthian king.
 Glaucus, a mythical Lycian captain in the Trojan War.
 Glaucus, son of King Minos of Crete.
 Glaucus, one of the twelve younger Panes, offspring of Pan. He came to join Dionysus in his campaign against India.
 Glaucus, son of Aretus and Laobie. He joined Deriades, along with his father and brothers, against Dionysus in the Indian War.
 Glaucus, husband of Laophonte and father of Leda in some variants of the myth. He may be the same as Glaucus, the son of Sisyphus if hypothetical deduction of genealogy be used.
 Glaucus, one of the Dolionians, a people living in northwestern Asia Minor. He was killed by Jason when the Argonauts came to the country.
 Glaucus, a Trojan prince and one of the sons of King Priam by an unknown woman.
 Glaucus, son of Antenor, one of the Trojan elders, and Theano. He was the brother of Crino, Acamas, Agenor, Antheus, Archelochus, Coön, Demoleon, Eurymachus, Helicaon, Iphidamas, Laodamas, Laodocus, Medon, Polybus  and Thersilochus. Glaucus was rescued during the sack of Troy by the intervention of Odysseus and Menelaus.
 Glaucus, one of the Suitors of Penelope who came from Dulichium along with other 56 wooers. He, with the other suitors, was shot dead by Odysseus with the aid of Eumaeus, Philoetius, and Telemachus.
Glaucus, a son of Aepytus.

Notes

References 

 Apollodorus, The Library with an English Translation by Sir James George Frazer, F.B.A., F.R.S. in 2 Volumes, Cambridge, MA, Harvard University Press; London, William Heinemann Ltd. 1921. ISBN 0-674-99135-4. Online version at the Perseus Digital Library. Greek text available from the same website.
Dictys Cretensis, from The Trojan War. The Chronicles of Dictys of Crete and Dares the Phrygian translated by Richard McIlwaine Frazer, Jr. (1931-). Indiana University Press. 1966. Online version at the Topos Text Project.
Gaius Julius Hyginus, Fabulae from The Myths of Hyginus translated and edited by Mary Grant. University of Kansas Publications in Humanistic Studies. Online version at the Topos Text Project.
 Gaius Valerius Flaccus, Argonautica translated by Mozley, J H. Loeb Classical Library Volume 286. Cambridge, MA, Harvard University Press; London, William Heinemann Ltd. 1928. Online version at theio.com.
 Gaius Valerius Flaccus, Argonauticon. Otto Kramer. Leipzig. Teubner. 1913. Latin text available at the Perseus Digital Library.
 Homer, The Iliad with an English Translation by A.T. Murray, Ph.D. in two volumes. Cambridge, MA., Harvard University Press; London, William Heinemann, Ltd. 1924. . Online version at the Perseus Digital Library.
Homer, Homeri Opera in five volumes. Oxford, Oxford University Press. 1920. . Greek text available at the Perseus Digital Library.
 Lyra Graeca Volume I, translated by Edmonds, J M. Loeb Classical Library Volume 28. Cambridge, MA, Harvard University Press; London, William Heinemann Ltd. 1922. Online version at theoi.com
 Nonnus of Panopolis, Dionysiaca translated by William Henry Denham Rouse (1863-1950), from the Loeb Classical Library, Cambridge, MA, Harvard University Press, 1940.  Online version at the Topos Text Project.
 Nonnus of Panopolis, Dionysiaca. 3 Vols. W.H.D. Rouse. Cambridge, MA., Harvard University Press; London, William Heinemann, Ltd. 1940–1942. Greek text available at the Perseus Digital Library.
 Pausanias, Description of Greece with an English Translation by W.H.S. Jones, Litt.D., and H.A. Ormerod, M.A., in 4 Volumes. Cambridge, MA, Harvard University Press; London, William Heinemann Ltd. 1918. . Online version at the Perseus Digital Library
Pausanias, Graeciae Descriptio. 3 vols. Leipzig, Teubner. 1903.  Greek text available at the Perseus Digital Library.
 Publius Vergilius Maro, Aeneid. Theodore C. Williams. trans. Boston. Houghton Mifflin Co. 1910. Online version at the Perseus Digital Library.
 Publius Vergilius Maro, Bucolics, Aeneid, and Georgics. J. B. Greenough. Boston. Ginn & Co. 1900. Latin text available at the Perseus Digital Library.
 Tzetzes, John, Allegories of the Iliad translated by Goldwyn, Adam J. and Kokkini, Dimitra. Dumbarton Oaks Medieval Library, Harvard University Press, 2015.

Greek gods
Satyrs
Princes in Greek mythology
Trojans
Children of Priam
People of the Trojan War
Suitors of Penelope
Characters in the Argonautica
Dionysus in mythology